Chen Zitong (born 27 February 1997) is a Chinese footballer currently playing as a midfielder for Zibo Qisheng in China League Two.

Club career
Chen Zitong would be promoted to the senior team of Shijiazhuang Ever Bright in the 2018 China League One campaign and would go on to make his debut on 12 April 2018 in a Chinese FA Cup game against Wuhan Chufeng Heli that ended in a 1–1 draw, but lost in a penalty shootout. He would have to wait until 26 July 2020 to make his league debut in a Chinese Super League game against Hebei China Fortune that ended in a 2–2 draw.

Career statistics

References

External links
 

1997 births
Living people
Chinese footballers
Association football midfielders
Chinese Super League players
Cangzhou Mighty Lions F.C. players
21st-century Chinese people